Gensui Baron  was Commander of the Kwantung Army in 1933, Japanese ambassador to Manchukuo, and a field marshal in the Imperial Japanese Army.

Biography
Mutō was born in an ex-samurai family from Saga Domain. After graduating from the Imperial Japanese Army Academy, he served in the First Sino-Japanese War as a lieutenant in the infantry. After the war (and his promotion to captain) he was sent twice to Russia as a military attaché, spending time in Vladivostok and in Odessa. He was fluent in the Russian language, which proved invaluable during the Russo-Japanese War. After his promotion to major, then colonel, he returned to Japan in a posting with the Imperial Guards.

From 1915-1916, Mutō was Chief of 2nd Section (Maneuvers), 1st Bureau, Imperial Japanese Army General Staff. From 1917, he was assigned to military intelligence and headed the Harbin Special Agency and operational offices in Irkutsk and Omsk. He returned to administrative positions in Japan from 1919–1921, before being appointed commander of the IJA 3rd Division in 1921 and being dispatched to Russia during the Siberian Expedition against the Bolshevik Red Army.

Mutō returned to Japan in 1922 as Vice Chief of the General Staff to 1925, and a member of the Supreme War Council from 1925-1926. He was briefly appointed commander of Tokyo Defense Command before assuming the role of Commander in Chief of the Kwantung Army, from 28 July 1926 – 26 August 1927.

Baron Mutō was active in the founding the puppet state of Manchukuo. After a stint as Inspector-General of Military Training (26 August 1927 – 26 May 1932), he then returned to Manchuria from 1932 to 1933 as Commander in Chief of the Manchukuo Imperial Army, while simultaneously holding the positions of Commander of the Kwantung Army and Governor of Kwantung Leased Territory. As Ambassador Extraordinary and Plenipotentiary to Emperor Hirohito, Mutō signed the Japan-Manchukuo Protocol of 1932. In 1933, he supervised Operation Nekka, the invasion of Jehol. In early 1933, he was promoted to Gensui.

Diagnosed with jaundice, Mutō died in a hospital in Hsinking, Manchukuo. His elevation to the title of danshaku (baron) was posthumous, as were his awards of the Order of the Golden Kite (1st class) and Order of the Rising Sun (1st class). His grave is at the Buddhist temple of Gokoku-ji in Tokyo, and the sword he received on his promotion to gensui is on display at the Yūshūkan Museum at Yasukuni Shrine in Tokyo.

Alternate theory of death 

Amleto Vespa, a spy and former mercenary active in Manchukuo, and the journalist Edgar Snow claimed that Mutō did not die of jaundice; that he had, rather, committed seppuku to protest the corruption and abuses he found in Manchukuo.

References

Books

External links

Muto's Field Marshal Sword at Yasukuni Museum, Tokyo

Notes 

Japanese generals
Japanese colonial governors and administrators
1868 births
1933 deaths
Kazoku
Marshals of Japan
Japanese military personnel of the Russo-Japanese War
People of the Kwantung Leased Territory
People from Saga (city)
Recipients of the Order of the Rising Sun
Recipients of the Order of the Golden Kite